Abdel-Ru'ouf Nayef Mezaal Al-Rawabdeh is a Jordanian footballer who plays for Al-Ahli SC (Amman).

References

External links
 

Living people
Jordanian footballers
Jordan international footballers
Association football midfielders
1991 births
Al-Ahli SC (Amman) players
Al-Sareeh SC players
Al-Jalil players
Al-Arabi (Jordan) players